The 1991 Florida State Seminoles baseball team represented Florida State University in the 1991 NCAA Division I baseball season. The Seminoles played their home games at Dick Howser Stadium. The team was coached by Mike Martin in his twelfth season as head coach at Florida State.

Personnel

Roster

Coaches

Schedule and results

Notes

References

Florida State Seminoles baseball seasons
Florida State Seminoles
College World Series seasons
Florida State Seminoles baseball
Florida State